John Theodore McNaughton (November 21, 1921 – July 19, 1967) born in Bicknell, Indiana, was United States Assistant Secretary of Defense for International Security Affairs and Robert S. McNamara's closest advisor.  He died in a plane crash at age 45, just before he was to become Secretary of the Navy.

Early life
John McNaughton was born in Bicknell, Indiana; his father owned the Bicknell Daily News.  The family moved to Pekin, Illinois in his younger years because his father later owned the Pekin Daily Times. John McNaughton graduated in 1942 from DePauw University. He joined the United States Navy that year and served on ships in the Atlantic. In 1946, he entered the Harvard Law School graduating in 1948. He was named a Rhodes Scholar that same year and spent 1949 at Oxford. In 1950, he took a year off and took a position in the European Payments Union under the Marshall Plan. He returned to the United States in 1951 and became editor of the Pekin Daily Times. A year later, he ran for congress in the Illinois's 18th congressional district as a Democrat. He was defeated in the election by Harold H. Velde

Career
Tall and fast-talking McNaughton began his career as an academic as an associate professor at the Harvard Law School in 1953.  Major General Charles J. Timmes later said that McNaughton, during a discussion of the Vietnam War had asserted that one could find the solution to any problem "by simply dissecting it into all its elements and then piecing together the resultant formula".

He had been friends with strategic theorist (and later Nobel prize winner in economics) Thomas Schelling since they worked in the administration of the Marshall Plan in Paris. In 1964, when McNaughton and Schelling were teaching at Harvard, Schelling was asked to work at the Department of Defense. He suggested McNaughton go instead, promising to advise McNaughton on weapons and strategy; McNaughton was appointed Assistant Secretary of Defense for International Security Affairs.

Together, they outlined a bombing strategy to intimidate North Vietnam in the spring of 1964, leading to the first phase of Operation Rolling Thunder which took place between March 2 and 24, 1965.

The conditions for a bombing halt, outlined in a confidential memorandum by McNaughton to McNamara were that North Vietnam must not only cease infiltration efforts, but also take steps to withdraw troops currently operating in South Vietnam. In addition, the Viet Cong should agree to terminate terror and sabotage activities and allow Saigon to exercise "governmental functions over substantially all of South Vietnam."

The North Vietnamese did not react to the bombing in the ways the American officials expected. North Vietnam was not intimidated by the bombing. Political reality had proved more complex than the abstract models of game theory.

In 1966 McNaughton and his deputy Adam Yarmolinsky had to admit, in a JASON study, that the air strikes had failed.

A pragmatist, McNaughton understood that only one aspect of the war effort was not a double-edged sword and could make the difference in the long term: the effort to turn South Vietnam into a viable political society, able to withstand the North's assault with U. S. help. In March 1965, McNaughton told President Johnson that while such efforts might not pay off quickly enough to affect the present ominous deterioration, some may, and we are dealing here in small critical margins. Furthermore, such investment [was] essential to provide a foundation for the longer run.

McNaughton was referencing the nation-building strategy devised by the Major-General Edward Lansdale, who had become a counterinsurgency expert after defeating the Huk rebellion in the Philippines in the 1950s,  Sir Robert Thompson — a British counter-insurgency expert and Roger Hilsman — a former American guerilla in Burma and the director of intelligence for the Department of State in the Kennedy administration. Edward Lansdale had made the point that the South's dependency on aid had the effect of placing the U.S. in the position of providing major help on an endless basis, with the consequence that if such aid were lessened then the enemy would win.

Personal life 
He was married to Sarah Elizabeth "Sally" Fulkman (born February 14, 1921). They had two sons, Alexander "Alex" and Theodore "Ted" (born July 23, 1955).

McNamara confided privately that McNaughton could have been his choice to replace him as Secretary of Defense. McNaughton resigned from the post of Assistant Secretary of Defense and was to become Secretary of the Navy on August 1, 1967 after being confirmed by the United States Senate. However, he was killed in the Piedmont Airlines Flight 22 accident with his wife and younger son Theodore on July 19, 1967.

The bridge carrying Illinois Route 9 across the Illinois River in Pekin, Illinois is named after McNaughton. There is also a John T. McNaughton Park just northeast of Pekin.

References

External links
The Last Salute: Civil and Military Funeral, 1921-1969, CHAPTER XXVII, Secretary of the Navy-Designate John T. McNaughton, Sarah McNaughton, and Theodore McNaughton, Special Military Funeral, 19-25 July 1967 by B. C. Mossman and M. W. Stark

1921 births
1967 deaths
Accidental deaths in North Carolina
American people of the Vietnam War
American Rhodes Scholars
DePauw University alumni
Harvard Law School alumni
Harvard University faculty
Illinois Democrats
Military personnel from Illinois
People from Pekin, Illinois
United States Assistant Secretaries of Defense
United States Department of Defense officials
United States Secretaries of the Navy
Victims of aviation accidents or incidents in 1967
Victims of aviation accidents or incidents in the United States
United States Navy personnel of World War II